Abd al-Qadir al-Husayni, also spelled Abd al-Qader al-Husseini (1907 – 8 April 1948) was a Palestinian Arab nationalist and fighter who in late 1933 founded the secret militant group known as the Organization for Holy Struggle (Munathamat al-Jihad al-Muqaddas), which he and Hasan Salama commanded as the Army of the Holy War (Jaysh al-Jihad al-Muqaddas) during the 1936–1939 Arab revolt and during the 1948 war.

Family and early nationalist career
 
Husayni was born to the prominent and influential al-Husayni family of Jerusalem. He was a son of Musa al-Husayni. He lost his mother a year and a half after his birth. Subsequently, his grandmother took care of him and his seven other siblings, three girls, four boys. 

His father, Musa al-Husayni, held various senior positions in the Ottoman Empire, working in Yemen, Iraq, Najd and Constantinople (Istanbul) in addition to Palestine. Because of his valuable service to the Ottoman Empire, the government granted him the title (Pasha). He was mayor of Jerusalem (1918–1920), before he was dismissed as mayor by the British authorities. He then became head of the nationalist Executive Committee of the Palestine Arab Congress from 1922 until 1934. Musa was the first to raise his voice in the face of the British Mandate, and the first to call the people of Palestine to protest, demonstrate and show their discontent and anger against the Balfour Declaration. He participated in many demonstrations, the last of which was the large demonstration in Jaffa on 27 October 1933, in which he was severely beaten with batons by the British soldiers. Musa's injuries were so serious that he remained bedridden until he died in March 1934.

Abd al-Qadir completed his secondary education in Jerusalem with distinction and then started at the College of Arts and Sciences at the American University of Beirut, but did not continue his studies there. Instead he went to and later graduated in chemistry at the American University in Cairo while organising the Congress of Educated Muslims.

Initially, he took a post in the settlement department of the British Mandate government but eventually moved to the Hebron area during the 1936–1939 Arab revolt in Palestine to lead the struggle against the British. A member of the Palestine Arab Party, he served as its secretary-general and became editor-in-chief of the party's paper Al-Liwa and other newspapers, including Al-Jami'a Al-Islamiyya.

Abd al-Qadir married in 1934. In 1940 his son Faisal al-Husayni was born who would go onto being the founder and leader of Arab Studies Society, head of Fatah organization in the West Bank and Palestinian Authority Minister for Jerusalem Affairs.

Battle of al-Qastal
In 1938, Abd al-Qadir was exiled and in 1939 moved to Iraq where he took part in the Rashid Ali al-Gaylani coup. He moved to Egypt in 1946, but secretly returned to Palestine to lead the Army of the Holy War in January 1948. Husayni was killed while personally reconnoitring an area of Qastal Hill shrouded by fog, in the early hours of 8 April 1948. His forces later captured al-Qastal from the Haganah, which had occupied the village at the start of Operation Nachshon six days earlier with a force of about 100 men. They retreated to the Jewish settlement of Motza. Palmach troops recaptured the village on the night of 8–9 April, losing 18 men in the attack; most of the houses were blown up and the hill became a command post. Huseyni's death was regarded as a factor in the loss of morale among his forces.

He was buried in the Khātūniyya by the al-Aqsa Compound (Ḥaram esh-Sharīf); the tombs of his father and his son are in the same mausoleum.

See also
 Ben Yehuda Street bombing

Footnotes

References

 Benveniśtî, Mêrôn (2002). Sacred Landscape: The Buried History of the Holy Land Since 1948. University of California Press. 
 Levenberg, Haim (1993). Military Preparations of the Arab Community in Palestine: 1945-1948. London: Routledge. 
Morris, Benny (2003). The Birth of the Palestinian Refugee Problem Revisited. Cambridge University Press. 
Morris, Benny (2008). 1948. Yale University Press. 
Robinson, Glenn E. (1997) Building a Palestinian State: The Incomplete Revolution. Indiana University Press. 
Sayigh, Yezid (2000). Armed Struggle and the Search for State: The Palestinian National Movement, 1949-1993. Oxford: Oxford University Press. 
Swedenburg, Ted (1999). The role of the Palestinian peasantry in the Great Revolt (1936–39). In Ilan Pappé (Ed.). The Israel/Palestine Question (pp. 129–168). London: Routledge.

External links
Handwritten letter by Abd al-Qadir al-Husayni
PASSIA
Abd al-Qadir al-Husayni's Koran http://www.ynetnews.com/articles/0,7340,L-3406966,00.html
Biography by Hasan Afif El-Hasan

1907 births
1948 deaths
Abd al-Qadir
The American University in Cairo alumni
Palestinian Arab nationalists
Palestinian military personnel
Palestinian nationalists
Palestinian people of the 1948 Arab–Israeli War
People from Jerusalem
Rebel commanders of the 1936–1939 Arab revolt in Palestine
20th-century Palestinian people